The Impatiente was a  of the French Navy.

She took part in the Expédition d'Irlande, where she was wrecked on 29 December 1796. Only 7 survived, and 420 were lost.

References

Age of Sail frigates of France
Romaine-class frigates
1795 ships
Shipwrecks in the Atlantic Ocean
Maritime incidents in 1796
Captured ships
Ships built in France